Regan Elizabeth Hood Scott (born August 10, 1983), also known as Regan Hood or Regan Scott, is an American female volleyball player, who plays as an Outside-spiker.  She was part of the United States women's national volleyball team and she participated in the 2013 FIVB Volleyball World Grand Prix. At club level, she plays for Olympiacos S.F. Piraeus in Hellenic Volley league.

Clubs
  LSU Lady Tigers (2001–2005)
  DOK Dwingeloo (2006–2007)
  CV Albacete (2007–2008)
  Terville Florange (2008–2009)
  ASPTT Mulhouse (2009–2011)
  VC Baku (2011–2012)
  CS Dinamo București (2012–2013)
  İller Bankası (2013–2015)
  Criollas de Caguas (2015–2015)
  Sarıyer Belediyespor (2015–2016)
  MKS Dąbrowa Górnicza (2016–2016)
  Jakarta Pertamina Energi (2017–2017)
  Samsun Anakent (2017–2018)
  Pallavolo Scandicci (2018–2018)
 Olympiacos Piraeus (2018–2019)
  Olympiacos Piraeus (2019–2019)
 Olympiacos Piraeus (2020–2021)
  CSM Volei Alba-Blaj (2021-2021)
  Leonas De Ponce (2021-2021)

Sporting achievements

National Team
 2011  Pan American Games
 2014  Pan-American Volleyball Cup (Mexico City)

Clubs

International competitions
 2012   CEV Women's Challenge Cup, with VC Baku

National championships
 2009/2010  French Championship, with ASPTT Mulhouse
 2010/2011  French Championship, with ASPTT Mulhouse
 2013/2012  Romanian Championship, with CS Dinamo București
 2014/2015  Puerto Rican Championship, with Criollas de Caguas
 2018/2019  Hellenic Championship, with Olympiacos Piraeus

National cups
 2009/2010  Cup of France, with ASPTT Mulhouse
 2012/2013  Romanian Cup, with CS Dinamo București
 2018/2019  Hellenic Cup, with Olympiacos Piraeus

References

External links
 Profile at FIVB
 Profile at CEV
 Profile at women.volleybox.net

1983 births
Sportspeople from Lafayette, Louisiana
Living people
American women's volleyball players
Volleyball players at the 2011 Pan American Games
Pan American Games medalists in volleyball
Pan American Games bronze medalists for the United States
Outside hitters
Olympiacos Women's Volleyball players
LSU Tigers women's volleyball players
Expatriate volleyball players in Spain
Expatriate volleyball players in the Netherlands
Expatriate volleyball players in France
Expatriate volleyball players in Azerbaijan
American expatriate sportspeople in Azerbaijan
Expatriate volleyball players in Romania
Expatriate volleyball players in Turkey
Expatriate volleyball players in Poland
American expatriate sportspeople in Spain
American expatriate sportspeople in the Netherlands
American expatriate sportspeople in France
American expatriate sportspeople in Romania
American expatriate sportspeople in Turkey
American expatriate sportspeople in Poland
Medalists at the 2011 Pan American Games
American expatriate sportspeople in Greece
Expatriate volleyball players in Greece
American expatriate volleyball players